The Centre for Contemporary Cultural Studies (CCCS) was a research centre at the University of Birmingham, England. It was founded in 1964 by Stuart Hall and Richard Hoggart, its first director. From 1964 to 2002, it played a critical role in developing the field of cultural studies.

History 
The centre was the focus for what became known as the Birmingham School of Cultural Studies, or, more generally, 'British cultural studies'.  After its first director, Richard Hoggart departed in 1968, the centre was led by Stuart Hall (19691979). He was succeeded by Richard Johnson (19801987).  The Birmingham CCCS approach to culture and politics evolved from a complex moment within British post-war history: the rise of the anti-Stalinist New Left; the promotion of adult education in Britain after World War II; the "Americanization" of British popular culture and the growth of mass communication in the decades after 1945; the growing multiculturalism of British society; and, the eventual influence within British academia of new critical methods like semiotics and structuralism. Drawing on a variety of influences (feminism, structuralism, Marxism  especially the work of Louis Althusser and Antonio Gramsci, sociology, critical race theory, and post-structuralism), over the course of several decades the Centre pioneered a variety of approaches to the study of culture, including: ideological analysis; studies of working-class cultures and subcultures; the role of media audiences; feminist cultural research; hegemonic struggles in state politics; and the place of race in social and cultural processes. Notable Centre books include Off-Centre: Feminism and Cultural Studies, Resistance through Rituals, The Empire Strikes Back, Border Patrols: Policing the Boundaries of Heterosexuality. The history of this development can be found in the series of stencilled occasional papers the Centre published between 1973 and 1988. To mark the 50th anniversary of the CCCS's founding, the University of Birmingham—in collaboration with former members of staff at the centre, including Richard Johnson, Stuart Hall, and Michael Green—created an archive of CCCS-related material at the Cadbury Research Library at Birmingham.

Noted staff members 

The Centre produced many key studies and developed the careers of prominent researchers and academics. Stuart Hall, who became the centre's director in 1968, developed his seminal Encoding/Decoding model of communication here. Of special importance is the collective research that led to Policing the Crisis (1978), a study of law and order campaigns that focused on "mugging" (a code for street violence). This anticipated many of the law and order themes of Margaret Thatcher's Conservative government in the 1980s. David Morley and Charlotte Brunsdon pioneered the centre's approach to empirical  research in The Nationwide Project .

Richard Johnson was later director and encouraged research in social and cultural history. The centre staff included Maureen McNeil, noted theorist of culture and science, Michael Green who focused on media,  cultural policy and regional cultures in the midlands, and Ann Gray, culture and media.

Closure in 2002 
The new Department of Cultural Studies and Sociology was unexpectedly and abruptly closed in 2002, a move the university's senior management described as "restructuring". The immediate reason given for disestablishment of the new department was an unexpectedly low result in the UK's Research Assessment Exercise of 2001, though a dean from the university described the decision as a consequence of "inexperienced 'macho management'".  Students and staff unsuccessfully campaigned to save the school, which gained considerable attention in the national press and sparked numerous letters of support from former alumni all over the world. Four of the department's 14 members of staff were to be "retained" and its hundreds of students (nearly 250 undergraduates and postgraduates at that time, many from abroad) to be transferred to other departments. In the ensuing dispute most department staff left.

References

External links 

Conditions of their Own Making: An Intellectual History of the Centre for Contemporary Cultural Studies at the University of Birmingham by Norma Schulman
Alec Gordon, "The Genesis of Radical Cultural Studies: Contribution to a Reconstruction of Cultural Studies as Counter-Intellectual Critique" [The Intellectual History of the Centre for Contemporary Cultural Studies, University of Birmingham, England, 1963–1975].
Unpublished Ph.D. thesis, University of Leeds, June 1988. 
CCCS Publications - Stencilled Papers by CCCS
Department of Sociology, University of Birmingham
Centre for Contemporary Cultural Studies – A research project (running from February 2013- February 2015) examining the history of the CCCS, at the University of Birmingham, Department of History.

Birmingham school
University of Birmingham
Cultural studies organizations
Research institutes in the West Midlands (county)
Social science institutes
Research institutes established in 1964